Cerro Largo Fútbol Club is a football club from Melo, Cerro Largo Department in Uruguay. They play their games at Estadio Arquitecto Antonio Eleuterio Ubilla. They are followed by many fans since it is the only professional team that represents the Cerro Largo Department. They currently play in the Uruguayan First División.

History
The club was founded in 2002, making them one of the youngest teams in Uruguay. In their first ever season, they placed 9th in the final league table.

In 2007, after an excellent campaign in the Uruguayan Segunda División, the club was promoted for the first time in their life to the Primera Division where they played for two consecutive seasons.

In 2011, although they had finished 6th, they qualified for the promotion playoffs and were promoted after beating Atenas and Boston River. They were relegated in the 2013-14 season. They lost the Segunda Division promotion play off in 2016 and 2017.

In 2018, after battling for three consecutive years, they won the Segunda Division and were promoted back to the Primera Division. In 2019, they finished 3rd in the league and qualified for the 2020 Copa Libertadores for their first time ever.

Performance in CONMEBOL competitions
Copa Sudamericana: 1 appearance
2012: First stage

Current squad

Managers
  Danielo Nunez (January 2009 - May 2013)
  Juan Jacinto Rodríguez (June 2013 - November 2013)
  Eduardo Uzal (November 2013 - March 2014)
  Danielo Núñez (April 2014 - May 2015)
  Gustavo Lucas (July 2015 - May 2017)
  Adrian Fernandez (May 2017 - December 2017)
  Danielo Nunez (January 2018 – present)

Achievements
Segunda Division

 Winner: 2018
 Runner-up: 2007-08, 2016

References

External links
 Cerro Largo FC - AUF Profile

 
Football clubs in Uruguay
Association football clubs established in 2002
2002 establishments in Uruguay